Northwood High School is located in Pittsboro, Chatham County, North Carolina, United States. The school is the largest of three high schools in Chatham County and is operated by Chatham County Schools. The school's mascot is the Charger and the school colors are gold and green. It is a member of the Big Eight 3A Athletic Conference. It currently serves around 1,024 students. The school receives students primarily from the eastern and northeastern portions of the county, which coincidentally are the fastest growing parts of the county.

History
Northwood High School opened in time for the 1972–1973 school year to replace the older Pittsboro High School which is now the headquarters of Chatham County Schools. The school was opened two school years after school integration (schools were not fully integrated in Chatham County until the 1970–1971 school year) as a way of consolidating black and white students into a larger facility than available at Pittsboro High. 
The school building has changed little since its opening with the exception of a new math wing and modular classrooms. A green steel roof was added during the 2000–2001 school year. During the 2009–2010 school year the arts wing was remodeled and expanded and the gymnasium was renovated.

Northwood High School has held their annual commencement ceremonies on the campus of UNC-Chapel Hill at the Dean Smith Center since 2008.

Principal: Bradford Walston (2018–present)

Athletics

Northwood currently provides the following JV and Varsity sports:

Fall:   
 Football
 Women's Volleyball
 Men's and Women's Cross-Country
 Men's Soccer
 Women's Tennis
 Women's Golf
 Cheerleading

Winter:  
 Swimming
 Men's and Women's Basketball
 Men's and Women's Indoor Track
 Wrestling

Spring:
 Men's Golf
 Men's Tennis
 Club Lacrosse
 Women's Soccer
 Men's and Women's Track
 Baseball
 Softball
 Lacrosse

Student organizations
Northwood currently has around 35 clubs, such as FBLA, FCCLA, DECA, FFA, weight-lifting, and a Minecraft Club. The school's Ultimate Frisbee team took 1st in state during their 2006–2007 season, defeating Cardinal Gibbons High School in the state semi-finals, and then Chapel Hill High School in the championship game, 13-11. Northwood's branch of FCCLA are renowned for their excellence in Parliamentary Procedure competitions. A team of eight females, all class of 2008 students, have won three state and national championships since 2004, traveling to San Diego, Nashville, and Anaheim. In 2009 the music department added a Tri-M  honor society. Northwood fielded a Science Olympiad team in the spring of 2010 winning multiple 1st, 2nd, and 5th place medals at the Regional competition at UNC-Greensboro. In 2011, the Science Olympiad team won first place overall at Regionals that took place at Campbell University, advancing to the State competition level. In 2019, FBLA had eight members place in the top 4 at the state level and advance to the national competition in San Antonio.

Marching band 

Former director Eugene Cottrell led Northwood's marching band to its first ever all-superior season in 2002, an achievement repeated by the band numerous times under Cottrell's 15 years of leadership.  In 2004 The Marching Charger Band received a grant from the Mr. Holland's Opus Foundation and was selected as an exemplary national model for band program development. On October 7, 2006 The Marching Chargers placed 2nd in class   and 11th overall nationally in The Yamaha Cup, a marching band competition held at Giant's Stadium in East Rutherford, New Jersey. Under Cottrell's successor, Brett Cox, the marching band has continued to win championships at distinguished regional competitions including Western Alamance, The Brick Capital Classic, Danville Dixie Classic, and Union Pines.
In 2018, Jason Freeman took Brett Cox's place as head band director at Northwood High. Hagan Zoellers took the place of Jason Freeman as head band director beginning in the 2022-2023 school year.

Notable alumni
 Hailey Allen, Topcat Cheerleader for the Carolina Panthers
 Austin Brice, MLB pitcher
 Tobais Palmer, NFL wide receiver

References

External links
 Articles about Northwood High School in Chatham Journal newspaper

Public high schools in North Carolina
Schools in Chatham County, North Carolina